William James Brossart (born May 29, 1949) is a Canadian former professional ice hockey defenceman who played in the National Hockey League (NHL) with the Philadelphia Flyers, Toronto Maple Leafs and Washington Capitals between 1971 and 1976.

Playing career
Brossart was drafted by the Philadelphia Flyers in the 3rd round, 28th overall, of the 1969 NHL Amateur Draft.

Career statistics

Regular season and playoffs

External links
 
Profile at hockeydraftcentral.com

1949 births
Living people
Baltimore Clippers (SHL) players
Canadian ice hockey defencemen
Ice hockey people from Saskatchewan
Philadelphia Flyers draft picks
Philadelphia Flyers players
Quebec Aces (AHL) players
Richmond Robins players
Richmond Wildcats players
Swift Current Broncos players
Toronto Maple Leafs players
Washington Capitals players